The Training Service Medal was a military decoration of South Vietnam. Established in 1964, the medal recognized outstanding service in an assignment at a military school or training center. It could also be awarded for overall significant contributions to the training of the Republic of Vietnam Armed Forces.

Criteria
The Training Service Medal is awarded to instructors and cadres assigned to military training centers and schools. Recipients must have shown outstanding professional ability, devotion to duty, and made significant contributions to the training of the South Vietnamese military. 
Individuals who served as instructors, but were not assigned to training centers or schools could also be awarded the medal. They must have completed a certain number of training hours as set by the training schools and centers. They were also required to display outstanding professional ability and devotion to duty. The medal could be awarded to organizations, government officials, civilians, as well as foreigners who, through direct or indirect effort, contributed to the training of South Vietnamese military personnel.

References

Military awards and decorations of Vietnam
Awards established in 1964